Josef Triebensee (Trübensee) (November 21, 1772 Třeboň - April 22, 1846 Prague) was a Bohemian composer and oboist.

He studied composition with Albrechtsberger and oboe with his father, Georg Triebensee (January 28, 1746-June 14, 1813). He served in the private orchestra of Prince Schwarzenberg, and from 1782 to 1806 as first oboist of the Austrian Emperor's Harmonie (wind band). Concurrently, he also served as principal oboist at the Nationaltheater of Vienna. Other associations included second oboist at the Kärntnertortheater, Kapellmeister to Prince Liechtenstein's Harmonie at Feldsberg, the private orchestra of Count Hunyady (from 1811), a theater composer in Brno, and from 1816 to his retirement in 1836, director of the Prague Opera where he succeeded composer Carl Maria von Weber. Unlike Weber, his operas found little success.

Triebensee was the second oboist, with Olivier Hue, at the Theater auf der Wieden in Vienna in 1791 when he played the premiere of Mozart's Die Zauberflöte—explaining the peculiar difficulty of the second oboe parts in that work.

Triebensee's most important compositions were two sets of Harmoniemusik, the second appearing in 32 installments of ten or more movements. He wrote 12 comic operas for Vienna and Prague as well as vocal, orchestral, and chamber works.

Compositions

Works for Winds 
 1805 Treurmars, for wind octet
 Concertino, for fortepiano, wind octet (2 ob, 2 cl, 2 hn, 2 bsn) and contrabassoon
 Adagio - Allegro Molto
 Menuetto
 Andante con vars
 Menuetto
 Rondo
 Partita in B-flat major, for wind octet and trumpet
 Adagio - Allegro Moderato
 Andante
 Menuetto
 Allegro con moto
 Partita in E-flat Major, for wind octet
 Allegro Vivace
 Andante
 Menuetto
 Rondo
 Partita in D-minor, for wind octet
 Suite in B-flat Major
 Suite in E-flat Major
 Partitta in Dis (E-flat Major) (Musica Aeterna Verlag)
 Variations on an Original March
 Menuetto Con Variazioni in F on a theme from Mozart's Don Giovanni, for wind octet

Stage Works

Operas 

Instrumental music
 Konzert für die Oboe (Allgemeines Intelligenzblatt der Stadt Nürnberg p. 818)
 Double Concerto for violin and oboe (AMZ 1824, No. 26)

Vocal music
 Die Höhle auf dem Lorenzberge zu Prag im Herbste 1792 : Lied for voice and piano (A-Wien Mus.Hs.33215 Mus)
 Gebet der Armen für Ihre Wohltäter, for 5 soloists and choir (AMZ 1824, No. 26)
 Cantata Acis und Galathea for choir and winds (AMZ 1824, No. 8) 

Chamber music
 Grande Sonate for piano and violin (C. F. Whistling p.318 
 Sonate pour le Piano-Forte. Composée et dediée à Son Altesse Mademoiselle La Princesse Julis de Sulkowsky published in 2020 by Musica Aeterna Verlag/ Germany (http://www.musica-aeterna.de/Katalog.htm)
 1844 Trio in F Major, for two oboes and alto oboe [English horn]
 1844 Trio in C Major, for two oboes and alto oboe
 1844 Trio in B-flat Major, for two oboes and alto oboe
 Gran Quintuor, for piano, clarinet, alto oboe, basset horn, and bassoon
 Quintetto. In F : a Clavicembalo, Oboa, Violino, Viola e Violoncello(A-Wien Mus.Hs.11409 Mus)
 Quintett in Eb 1799 for strings (A-Wien S.m. 11517)
Menuetto con Variazioni in F
 Variace na Mozartovo téma
 Variations on Hadyn's symphony nr. 94 „mit dem Paukenschlag“, for two oboes and alto oboe
 6 Variationen über das tyroler Alpenlied for piano, violin and guitar (AMZ 1811, Intelligenzblatt)

Arrangements for Harmonie ensemble 
 Joseph Haydn (1732–1809): Symphony in G Major - "Oxford" (Nr. 92), arranged for 9-part harmonie.
 Adagio / Allegro spirituoso
 Adagio
 Menuetto, Allegretto
 Presto
 Wolfgang Amadeus Mozart (1756–1791): Don Giovanni, Overture and arias for harmonie (2 ob, 2 cl, 2 hn, 2 bsn, cbsn (ad lib.))
 Ouvertura
 Introduzione. Notte e giorno faticar
 Madamina, il catalogo è questo
 Giovinette che fate all' amore
 Dalla sua pace
 Fin ch'han dal vino
 Batti, Batti, o bel Masetto
 Presto presto pria ch'ei venga
 Wolfgang Amadeus Mozart (1756–1791): La clemenza di Tito, Overture and aria for harmonie
 Overture
 Deh prendi un dolce amplesso
 Marcia
 Del piu sublime soglio
 Wolfgang Amadeus Mozart (1756–1791): Cosi fan tutte, for harmonie
 Luigi Cherubini (1760–1842): - overture and arias from the opera Medea for wind octet
 Franz Schubert (1797–1828): music for the romantic play "Rosamunde, Princess of Cyprus" Helmina von Chezy D 797, arranged for harmonie.

References

External links
 

1772 births
1846 deaths
Austrian classical composers
Austrian classical oboists
Austrian male classical composers
Austrian opera composers
Czech classical composers
Czech classical oboists
Czech male classical composers
Czech opera composers
German Bohemian people
Male oboists
Male opera composers